Esmailabad (also Romanized as Esmā‘īlābād; also known as Esma’il Abad Hoomeh) is a village in Eslamiyeh Rural District, in the Central District of Rafsanjan County, Kerman Province, Iran. At the 2006 census, its population was 745, in 187 families.

References 

Populated places in Rafsanjan County